Ring game may refer to:

Ring game (pool), a general class of multi-player pocket billiards gambling games
Ring game, a.k.a. cash game, a poker game played with "real" chips and each player's own money at stake